Les Dudek (born August 2, 1952, at Naval Air Station, Quonset Point, Rhode Island, United States) is an American guitarist, singer and songwriter.

In addition to his solo material, Dudek has played guitar with Steve Miller Band, The Dudek-Finnigan-Krueger Band, Stevie Nicks, Cher, Boz Scaggs, The Allman Brothers Band, as well as Maria Muldaur, Bobby Whitlock, Mike Finnigan, Jim Krueger and Dave Mason.

Early years
Dudek's father, Harold, was born in Campbell, Nebraska, and was a World War II veteran in the United States Navy. His mother, Alma, born in Brooklyn, was a former Radio City Music Hall Rockette. Les has one older sister, Sandy, who was born in Brooklyn. The family is of Czech, German, Italian, and Russian descent. Six years after Les was born, his father retired from the Navy and the family moved to Florida where he grew up.

Musical career
The Beatles caught Dudek's ear at an early age. In 1962, at the age of ten, Les asked his parents for a guitar for Christmas. They bought him an acoustic guitar from Sears & Roebuck. His musical influences, along with The Beatles, were Cream, Jimi Hendrix, and The Ventures. He had built quite a reputation around the Florida area as a proficient guitar player, having started playing in local bands as a teenager. Those bands were "The United Sounds", "Blue Truth" and "Power". That reputation would place him in the studio with the Allman Brothers Band for the recording of the Brothers & Sisters album. He played guitar harmonies with Dickey Betts on the well-known song "Ramblin' Man" and acoustic guitar on "Jessica". In Alan Paul's book, One Way Out: The Inside History of the Allman Brothers Band, Dudek claimed to have written the part in "Jessica" from when it modulated into G then eventually back to A.

His next stops were as a guitarist for Boz Scaggs and The Steve Miller Band. Dudek was invited to play with Journey,  however, he had received an offer to record for Columbia Records as a solo artist and took that path instead. He recorded four solo albums for Columbia Records, Les Dudek, Say No More, Ghost Town Parade and Gypsy Ride. He had two minor hits with "City Magic" and "Old Judge Jones" which were played frequently on local radio stations in the Los Angeles, California area, where he lived at the time, having moved to West Hollywood in the mid-1970s.

He later collaborated with Cher, Stevie Nicks, and with two other Columbia artists, Mike Finnigan and Jim Krueger, with whom he formed The Dudek Finnigan Krueger Band in 1978. A DFKB album was released by Columbia Records a year later.

Between the years 1979 and 1982, Les and Cher had a personal as well as professional relationship.  Dudek wrote and performed some of the music for the 1984 movie Mask starring Cher, Sam Elliott, Eric Stoltz, and Laura Dern. He had a small part in the film as "Bone", a biker. Dudek also appeared in the TV movie, Streets of Justice (1985). He has worked for NBC, ABC, ESPN, Fox Sports, and E! Entertainment Television. He can be heard on many television series including Friends.

In 1985, Dudek played guitar with Stevie Nicks on her album Rock a Little, and undertook her subsequent tour.

In 1989, he did a brief stint with Canadian rock group John Kay & Steppenwolf as their guitarist. But problems developed between Dudek and Kay which led to him leaving the band after a month of touring.

Two more solo albums later, Deeper Shades Of Blues (1994) and Freestyle, Dudek hit the road again with his own band, and has been performing songs from all his records, plus a few hits he has recorded with other artists.

In 2013, he released another solo album, Delta Breeze.

Discography
Les Dudek
 Les Dudek (1976)
 Say No More (1977)
 Ghost Town Parade (1978)
 Gypsy Ride (1981)
 Deeper Shades of Blues (1994)
 Freestyle! (2003)
 Delta Breeze (2013)

The Dudek, Finnigan, Krueger Band
 The Dudek, Finnigan, Krueger Band (1980)

Steve Miller Band
 Fly Like an Eagle (1976)
 Book of Dreams (1977)
 Living in the 20th Century (1986)
 Wide River (1993)

 Stevie Nicks
  Rock a Little  (1985) 

Cher
 Black Rose (1980)

Boz Scaggs
 Silk Degrees (1976)

Maria Muldaur
 Southern Winds (1978)

Richard T. Bear
 Red Hot & Blue  (1978)
Mike Finnigan
 Black & White (1978)

The Allman Brothers Band
 Brothers & Sisters (1973)

Bobby Whitlock
 Rock Your Sox Off (1976)

References

https://www.mercurynews.com/2009/08/20/a-real-guitar-hero/

External links
 Les Dudek website

1952 births
American rock guitarists
American male guitarists
American people of Czech descent
American people of German descent
American people of Italian descent
American people of Russian descent
Living people
Guitarists from Florida
Steppenwolf (band) members
American rock singers
Songwriters from Rhode Island
Lead guitarists
Slide guitarists
American male singers
American session musicians
20th-century American guitarists
Singer-songwriters from Florida